Julio Valentín Ferreira González (born 26 August 1981 in Asunción) is a retired Paraguayan footballer who played as a striker.

González played for Paraguay at the 2004 Olympics, helping the squad to a silver medal. He also competed with the team at the 2004 Copa América.

Career
González, the top scorer for Serie B club Vicenza as of December 2005, was due to represent his country at the 2006 FIFA World Cup in Germany. However, on 22 December 2005, he was involved in a terrible car accident as he was going to Venice airport in order to take a flight over the holidays. After a long hospitalization, on 17 January 2006, González had his left arm amputated. The event was an important news item, and he immediately enjoyed the support of the whole sports world, including a visit from Alex Zanardi.

González then underwent a long period of rehabilitation, always considering a comeback to active football. The player, who was confirmed under contract with Vicenza for the 2006–07 season despite his inability was then awarded the Giacinto Facchetti Prize by Italian sports newspaper La Gazzetta dello Sport.

In July 2007, González returned to Paraguay and started training with club Tacuary, where his younger brother (Celso) plays. A few days later, he confirmed in an interview to La Gazzetta dello Sport he would also serve as local scout for his former team Vicenza.

González finally managed to make his comeback on 18 November 2007, playing for Tacuary in a Paraguayan First Division match against South American giants Olimpia Asunción. He played for 57 minutes. The news gained massive media exposure in Italy as well. In 2008, González went to play for Presidente Hayes.

Later that year in 2008, González took over Inter Campus, an Internazionale youth academy based in Paraguay.

International career
On 4 August, before the Summer Olympics began, he played in a preparation game against the Portugal of Cristiano Ronaldo in the city of Algarve, resulting in a 5–0 defeat.

References

1981 births
Living people
Paraguayan footballers
Paraguay international footballers
Paraguay under-20 international footballers
Paraguayan Primera División players
Serie B players
Argentine Primera División players
Club Tacuary footballers
Club Guaraní players
Club Nacional footballers
L.R. Vicenza players
Club Presidente Hayes footballers
Club Atlético Huracán footballers
2004 Copa América players
Olympic footballers of Paraguay
Footballers at the 2004 Summer Olympics
Olympic silver medalists for Paraguay
Paraguayan amputees
Paraguayan expatriate footballers
Paraguayan expatriates in Italy
Expatriate footballers in Italy
Expatriate footballers in Argentina
Olympic medalists in football
Medalists at the 2004 Summer Olympics
Association football forwards
Association footballers with limb difference